The Super-chicken model refers to a manner of team recruitment that favors bringing together highly driven overachievers. It is argued that this can be counterproductive because of the negative effects of hyper-competitiveness on a group's dynamic, and that recruitment that emphasizes collaboration over individual excellence can result in greater productivity. The name makes analogy to the interactions among chickens observed in a study by Purdue University evolutionary biologist William Muir.

William Muir's research
Purdue University biologist William Muir conducted an experiment using chickens. Muir segregated chickens based upon their egg production. He grouped average egg laying chickens together. And he grouped together a prolific egg laying flock: he called these "super chickens". Muir kept these chickens in their groups for two generations and he found that the average chickens were doing fine and they consistently produced eggs. In the super chickens group, Muir found that only three survived as the group had pecked each other to death.

The super chicken in business and sports
In business applications, employees work to become a "Super-chicken", and at times they keep their colleagues down so that they stay on top. According to Stanford University researcher Carol Dweck, people do not all have the same views on success. Some people try to prove they are smart, and others believe that they just need to work harder. Dweck claims talent should not be praised. She claims organizations which are thriving do not label employees: Dweck's research has shown that this method fosters collaboration and cooperation among employees. The concept is that in business everybody has value on the team. Employees need social support, and they need to go to each other for help. The model suggests that choosing the "supermen or superwomen" can create harmful competition which does not benefit the organization.

Margaret Heffernan gave a Ted Talk in 2015: she tied the Muir super-chicken research to employee behavior in a business setting. Heffernan said when employees collaborate rather than compete they create "Social capital" the term came from sociologists who studied how communities deal with stress. Teams working together for the good of the business develop trust in each other. She claimed that one company that synchronized coffee breaks to allow employees to talk to one another and the companies profits increased, while employee satisfaction went up 10 percent.

The Super-chicken mode of operation has produced adverse results in both sports franchises (comparing Real Madrid and Barcelona soccer teams) and other businesses. Survival of the fittest employee hiring models create adverse performance issues. This is a consequential synergy between individuals and group dynamics. Stack ranking can encourage antisocial behavior, and have deleterious effects upon group outcomes, citing Microsoft, Enron, and Amazon's experience.

See also
Crab mentality
Dominance hierarchy
Pecking order
Vitality curve

References

Notes

Citations

External links
Purdue University research page
Margret Heffernan Ted Talk

Animal genetics
Behavioural sciences
Behaviorism
Group processes
Production and manufacturing
Psychological theories

Social dynamics